Bamandanga  is a village in Chanditala II community development block of Srirampore subdivision in Hooghly district in the Indian state of West Bengal.

Geography

Gram panchayat
Villages and census towns in Chanditala gram panchayat are: Bamandanga, Benipur, Chanditala, Kalachhara and Pairagachha.

Demographics
As per 2011 Census of India, Bamandanga had a total population of 2,743 of which 1,420 (52%) were males and 1,323 (48%) were females. Population below 6 years was 220. The total number of literates in Bamandanga was 2,123 (84.15% of the population over 6 years).

Transport
The nearest railway station is Gobra railway station on the Howrah-Bardhaman chord line which is part of the Kolkata Suburban Railway system.

References 

Villages in Chanditala II CD Block